Douglas Knob el.  is an isolated mountain peak in the southwest section of Yellowstone National Park. Located just east of the Littler Fork of the Bechler River at the southern extent of the Madison Plateau, Douglas Knob is named for Joseph O. Douglas. In 1962, then Assistant Chief Ranger, William S. Chapman named the summit for Douglas who was an early Park Ranger. In 1921, Douglas was the Assistant Chief Ranger as well as the park's chief Buffalo Keeper.

See also
 Mountains and mountain ranges of Yellowstone National Park

Notes

Mountains of Wyoming
Mountains of Yellowstone National Park
Mountains of Teton County, Wyoming